Lares barrio-pueblo  is a barrio and the administrative center (seat) of Lares, a municipality of Puerto Rico. Its population in 2010 was 2,690.

As was customary in Spain, in Puerto Rico, the municipality has a barrio called pueblo which contains a central plaza, the municipal buildings (city hall), and a Catholic church. Fiestas patronales (patron saint festivals) are held in the central plaza every year.

The central plaza and its church
 is the name of the central plaza located in Lares Barrio Pueblo. The central plaza, or square, is a place for official and unofficial recreational events and a place where people can gather and socialize from dusk to dawn. The Laws of the Indies, Spanish law, which regulated life in Puerto Rico in the early 19th century, stated the plaza's purpose was for "the parties" (celebrations, festivities), and that the square should be proportionally large enough for the number of neighbors. These Spanish regulations also stated that the streets nearby should be comfortable portals for passersby, protecting them from the elements: sun and rain.

Originally made of wood, it was inaugurated in 1838. In 1881, it was remade based on a design by Ramón Soler with stone masonry but with wooden towers and a wooden roof. Then in the 1920s it was remodeled again. The building has changed completely but the original lateral walls and the first level of its front facade also remain from the original.

History
Puerto Rico was ceded by Spain in the aftermath of the Spanish–American War under the terms of the Treaty of Paris of 1898 and became an unincorporated territory of the United States. In 1899, the United States Department of War conducted a census of Puerto Rico finding that the population of Lares Pueblo was 1,450.

Sectors
Barrios (which are roughly comparable to minor civil divisions) and subbarrios, in turn, are further subdivided into smaller local populated place areas/units called sectores (sectors in English). The types of sectores may vary, from normally sector to urbanización to reparto to barriada to residencial, among others.

The following sectors are in Lares barrio-pueblo:

Gallery

See also

 List of communities in Puerto Rico
 List of barrios and sectors of Lares, Puerto Rico

References

External links

Barrios of Lares, Puerto Rico